Sean Burns may refer to:
 Sean Burns (administrator), Administrator of Ascension and Administrator of Tristan da Cunha.
 Sean Burns (footballer), Scottish football player
 One of the characters in the Highlander films

See also

 Sean Byrne (disambiguation)